San Francisco was the seventh album by American Music Club and their last before a nine-year hiatus.

Track listing
All songs written by Mark Eitzel. 
"Fearless" - 4:34
"It's Your Birthday" - 4:33
"Can You Help Me" - 3:11
"Love Doesn't Belong" - 4:22
"Wish the World Away" - 3:09
"How Many Six Packs Does It Take to Screw in a Light" - 4:15
"Cape Canaveral" - 5:04
"Hello Amsterdam" - 3:29
"The Revolving Door" - 4:47
"In the Shadow of the Valley" - 6:28
"What Holds the World Together" - 4:44
"I Broke My Promise" - 3:37
"The Thorn in My Side Is Gone" - 4:41
"I'll Be Gone" - 3:56
"California Dreamin'" (unlisted on CD) - 2:34

Personnel

Mark Eitzel - Vocals; guitars
Vudi - Guitars; backing vocals
Tim Mooney - Drums; guitar; backing vocals
Dan Pearson -  Bass; guitar; mandolin; backing vocals
Bruce Kaphan - Pedal steel; keyboards; guitar; tablas; backing vocals
Omewenne - Background vocals on Hello Amsterdam
Bill Ortiz - Trumpet on It's Your Birthday
Jean Lowe - Cover painting

References

1994 albums
American Music Club albums
Warner Records albums
Albums produced by Joe Chiccarelli